HD 192263 is an 8th magnitude star about 64 light years away in the constellation of Aquila. The spectral type of the star is K2V, meaning that it is an orange dwarf, a type of star somewhat cooler and less luminous than the Sun. It is not visible to the unaided eye, but with good binoculars or small telescope it should be easy to spot.

The star HD 192263 is named Phoenicia. The name was selected in the NameExoWorlds campaign by Lebanon, during the 100th anniversary of the IAU. Phoenicia was an ancient thalassocratic civilisation of the Mediterranean that originated from the area of modern-day Lebanon.

Various companions for the star have been reported, but all of them are probably line-of-sight optical components or just spurious observations.

The apparent direction of the star lies close to the Earth's Celestial equator, and it rotates almost edge-on to Earth's line of sight.

In 1999 an extrasolar planet was announced orbiting the star.

Planetary system
On 28 September 1999, a planet around HD 192263 was found by the Geneva Extrasolar Planet Search team using the CORALIE spectrograph on the 1.2m Euler Swiss Telescope at La Silla Observatory, discovered independently by Vogt et al.

See also
 List of extrasolar planets

References

External links 

 
 
 
 
 
 

K-type main-sequence stars
192263
099711
Aquila (constellation)
Planetary systems with one confirmed planet
Aquilae, V1703
BY Draconis variables
Durchmusterung objects